No Reasons Given is an album by Kevin Gilbert and Jason Hubbard released in 1984 (See 1984 in music). Most of the music was recorded and produced while Gilbert was still in high school. Several tracks from the extended edition can also be found on Gilbert's Call Me "Kai" box set released in 2021.

Track listing

Original album (LP and CD)
"Morning Light"
"Watching Me"
"Goodman Badman"
"Wings of Time"
"Mere Image"
"Welcome to Suburbia"
"Staring into Nothing"
"Frame by Frame"
"When Strangers Part"

Extended edition (streaming services only)
"Morning Light"
"Watching Me"
"Goodman Badman"
"Wings of Time"
"Mere Image"
"Welcome to Suburbia"
"Staring into Nothing"
"Frame by Frame"
"When Strangers Part"
"Mephisto's Tarantella"
"Masques"
"Schizophrenia"
"Suitcase Living"
"Rain Suite (A. If Ever Rain Will Fall)"
"Rain Suite (B. Broken Ties)"

Personnel
Kevin Gilbert – Lead Vocals, Acoustic Grand Piano, Prophet 5, Gleeman Pentaphonic, Roland Vocoder+, Hammond Organ, backing vocals, 6 & 12 String Guitars, Recorders, Vocal Loop Organ, SCI Drumtracks, Pots and Pans, Production Effects
Jason Hubbard – Fender Stratocaster, Ibanez Artist EQ, 6 & 12 string guitars, Classical guitar, Roland Juno 60, Backing Vocals, Seiko Digital Percussion, backwards Satanic Messages
Mickey Sorey – Kit Drums, Simmons SDS-5, Tympani, percussion, Laugh 
Additional musicians
Bob Carroll – Lead Vocals, Backing Vocals
Kevin Coyle – Saxes
Greg Gilbert – Bassoon
Jacque Harper – Bass
Kelly & Kerry Mangini – Backing Vocals
Ray Otsuka – Violins

References

External links
Kevin Gilbert's official website

1984 albums
Kevin Gilbert albums